The 2014 Indonesian Inter Island Cup qualification tournament was the qualification process for the 2014 Inter Island Cup, the third edition of the Indonesian Inter Island Cup. It was held from 10 January to 16 January 2014, and involved the 22 teams in 2014 Indonesia Super League. The format was a single  round-robin tournament.

The Kalimantan and Sulawesi-Papua zones were divided into two group each filled with four teams, with the top two teams in each zone qualifying for the tournament proper. For the Sumatra zone followed by Sriwijaya and Semen Padang, they played home-and-away system, with the winner qualifying for the tournament proper. For the Java zone, the 12 participating clubs were divided into three groups of four with the round robin system, and the winner from each group entered the tournament proper.

The draw for the tournament as well as the qualification tournament took place on 30 December 2013. PT Liga Indonesia officially announced Bandung Regency, Malang Regency, Surabaya, Banjar Regency and Jayapura as the hosts on 30 December 2013. PT Liga Indonesia decided to appoint Kediri replace Surabaya to host group 3 of the Java zone, because the police did not give permission to hold the match in Surabaya.

All times listed are local (UTC+07:00 (Western Indonesia Time), UTC+08:00 (Central Indonesia Time) and UTC+09:00 (East Indonesia Time)).

Venues
Seven locations were presented as potential Inter Island Cup qualification host cities: Palembang, Padang, Bandung Regency, Malang Regency, Surabaya, Banjar Regency and Jayapura.

Squads

Each team named a minimum of 18 players in their squads (three of whom were goalkeepers) by the deadline that Liga Indonesia determined was on 7 January 2014. Injury replacements were allowed until 24 hours before the team's first match.

Tie-breaking criteria
Ranking in each group shall be determined as follows:
Greater number of points obtained in all group matches;
Result of the direct match between the teams in question;
Goal difference in all group matches;
Greater number of goals scored in all group matches. 
If two or more teams are equal on the basis on the above four criteria, the place shall be determined as follows:
Kicks from the penalty mark if the teams in question are still on the field of play;
Drawing of lots by the Organising Committee.

Sumatra
Sriwijaya and Semen Padang played home-and-away system, with the winner qualifying for the tournament proper. Matches were played on 10 and 14 January 2014.

Result

First Leg

Second Leg

Java
In the Java zone, the 12 participating clubs were divided into three groups of four, and the winner from each group entered the tournament proper. This zone was played on 10 to 16 January 2014.

Group 1
All matches were played in Bandung Regency, on 13 to 16 January 2014.
Times listed are UTC+7.

Group 2
All matches were played in Malang Regency, on 10 to 13 January 2014.
Times listed are UTC+7.

Group 3
All matches were played in Kediri, on 12 to 15 January 2014. 
Times listed are UTC+7.

Kalimantan

All matches were played in Banjar Regency, on 10 to 13 January 2014.
Times listed are UTC+8.

Sulawesi-Papua

All matches were played in Jayapura, on 10 to 13 January 2014.
Times listed are UTC+9.

Tiebreakers
Perseru is ranked ahead of Persipura based on their head-to-head record.

Qualified teams

Goal scorers

Top Scorers

Own Goals

References

qualification